Prashant R. Khemka is a CFA, the founder and managing director of WhiteOak Capital Management, and the former CIO of emerging market equities for Goldman Sachs.

Early life and career 
Born on 4 November 1971, in Mumbai, India, Khemka obtained an MBA in Finance from the Owen Graduate School of Management under Vanderbilt University, Nashville, Tennessee, in 1988.

He started his professional career at State Street Global Advisors in Boston.

Life at Goldman Sachs Asset Management 
In 2000, Khekma joined Goldman Sachs as an equity analyst and was co-chairing an equity fund worth $30 billion within four years.

After returning to India in 2006, he started managing Goldman Sachs India Equity which received a AAA rating from Citywire. Under Khemka, Goldman’s Global Emerging Markets (GEM) Equity grew from less than $500 million to more than $2.6 billion. 

In 2017, Khemka quit Goldman Sachs India to launch his own Mumbai-based firm, White Oak Capital Management.

Personal life 
Prashant Khemka is married to Ritu Khemka and has three children. He is an avid cricket fan and was a chess enthusiast in college.

Sources 

Businesspeople from Mumbai
1971 births
Living people
CFA charterholders
Goldman Sachs people
Vanderbilt University alumni
University of Mumbai alumni